Another Scoop is a compilation album by Pete Townshend, and essentially a sequel to Scoop.

History
Like Scoop released in 1983, Another Scoop features a multitude of demos, outtakes and unreleased material, many of which are songs by The Who. It was followed by Scoop 3 in 2001, the third and last Scoop collection. All three albums were 2-disc sets, and in 2002 a pared-down compilation of them all was released as Scooped. Remastered versions of the original albums were released in 2006, and again in 2017.

Pete added liner notes to the release - "This is the second in a series of albums bringing together
demo-tapes, home recordings and unreleased oddities produced during my career in and out of The Who.

I want to thank my friend Spike for her tireless energy raking through hundreds of hours of music to put together another  interesting selection (she isn't even a Who fan!), and all the Who fans who've waited patiently while I garnered the courage to put it out. I also want to thank my friends at Atlantic records for making the space for me to release this record for collectors while I spend my time writing song for my next "serious" solo album."

PETE TOWNSHEND

July, 1986

The album is dedicated to the memory of Cliff Townshend.

Track listing
All songs written and composed by Pete Townshend, except where noted.

References

External links 
Promo Video for "Ask Yourself" at YouTube

1987 compilation albums
Pete Townshend compilation albums
Atco Records compilation albums
Albums produced by Pete Townshend
Sequel albums